Guaiacum coulteri is a species of flowering plant in the family Zygophyllaceae, that is native to western Mexico and Guatemala.

References

External links

coulteri
Plants described in 1854
Trees of Jalisco
Flora of Mexico
Flora of Guatemala
Taxonomy articles created by Polbot